Wura is a 2023 Showmax original Nigerian telenovela, executively produced by Rogers Ofime. The series is best known to be Nigerian first longest Showmax original series, starring Scarlet Gomez, Yomi Fash Lanso, Carol King, Ray Adeka, Iremide Adeoye, Ego Iheanacho, Martha Ehinome, Lanre Adediwura, Oluwaseyi Akinsola, Ropo Ewenla, Miracle Gabriel, and Tersy Akpata.

Wura is an adaptation of the South African telenovela series The River, an M-Net original production streaming on Showmax.

Plot
Wura tells the story of Wura Amoo-Adeleke, the ruthless CEO of the fictional Frontline Gold Mine, and the perfect wife, a mother of two, who will do anything to maintain her ground in the gold mining industry. In her family, Wura is faultless and a saint, but when it comes to running her business, she becomes that ruthless lady, who doesn’t care whose ox is gored in her path to get what she wants.

In the Iperindo community of Osun State, where the Wura mining business is located in Iperindo town, live poverty-stricken residents, many of whom work at the mine, including the Kuti family. The Kuti family, consisting of Pa Kuti, Iyabo Kuti, and their children, Olumide, Ebunoluwa, and Tumininu the adopted child, been found close to a river as a baby by her late adoptive father, Pa Kuti.

Cast

Main

Scarlet Gomes as Wura Amoo-Adeleke
Yomi Fash Lanso as Anthony Adeleke
Ray Adeka as Jejeloye “Jeje” Amoo
Iremide Adeoye as Lolu Adeleke
Oluwaseyi Akinsola as Femi
Ropo Ewenla as Olusegun “Pa” Kuti
Ego Iheanacho as Iyabo Kuti
Martha Ehinome as Tumininu “Tumi” Kuti
Lanre Adediwura as Olumide “Cobra” Kuti
Aweodein Adeola as Aunty Labake

Supporting

Carol King as Grace Adeleke
Miracle Gabriel as Ebunoluwa “Ebun” Kuti
Tersy Akpata as Ewa
Olawale Gold as Detective Kolapo
Rhoda Albert as Paulina
Muyiwa Donald as Kazeem
Toluwanimi Adekanmbi as Bisola
Jare Martins as Chief Popoola
Taiwo Ibikunle as Biggie
Ayorinde Babatope as Precy
Misi Molu as Omolara
Odufeso Olajumoke as Young Wura Amoo
Obadare Akinade as Young Olusegun Kuti
Adekunle David as Baby Tumi
Chukwuebuka Ude as Adewale

Episode
Each episode is released four times weekly from Monday to Thursday on Showmax.

Season 1 (2023)

Premiere and release
On 19 January 2023, The Ọọ̀ni of Ifẹ̀  (King of Ife), Oba Adeyeye Enitan Ogunwusi hosted a private screening at his palace of the first few episodes of the Showmax original series in Osun State. The King wives, Olori Tobi Philips Ogunwusi, Olori Aderonke Ademiluyi Ogunwusi, Olori Afolashade Ogunwusi, and Wura stars Scarlet Gomez, Yomi Fash-Lanso and Ego Iheanacho, alongside other cast and crew members where in attendance.

The king at the official premiere, described the show, saying: “The show was very well put together and professionally done”, and added to the remark by saying: “I’m very impressed and I rarely get impressed with things. I love the naturalistic effect of the series. It premiered to me at the palace and I could barely find any faults. I have to give the entire crew some major credit. The story is very well scripted and that’s the typical determination you find in any Nigerian. It’s a show that will impact society not only in Ife. I look forward to watching the rest of it because it’s very obvious that it’s a series that will address a lot of societal ills and will engage the citizenry as a whole.”

Reception

Critical reception

Wura has received favourable reviews from critics. Reviewing for Premium Times, Shola-Adido Oladotun said “If there is one thing Nollywood producers continue to teach us; it’s their fearlessness in exploring different film genres. With the release of Shanty Town and Showmax’s latest original project, ‘Wura’, one cannot help but get excited at what this year has in store.”

References

External links

 Wura at Showmax

2023 Nigerian television series debuts
2020s crime drama television series
English-language Showmax original programming
Nigerian drama television series
2023 telenovelas